Holmavatnet may refer to many lakes in Norway:

Holmavatnet (Eigersund), a lake in the municipality of Eigersund in Rogaland county
Holmavatnet (Kvam), a lake in the municipality of Kvam in Vestland county
Holmavatnet (Samnanger), a lake in the municipality of Samnanger in Vestland county
Holmavatnet (Skjold), a lake in the municipality of Vindafjord in Rogaland county
Holmavatnet (Ullensvang), a lake in the municipality of Ullensvang in Vestland county
Holmavatnet (Vaksdal), a lake in the municipality of Vaksdal in Vestland county 
Holmavatnet (Vinje), a lake on the borders of Vestfold og Telemark, Rogaland, and Agder counties

See also
Holmevatnet